is a single-member electoral district for the House of Representatives, the lower house of the National Diet of Japan. It is located in North-eastern Kanagawa Prefecture and consists of Kawasaki City's three eastern wards of Kawasaki, Saiwai and Nakahara. As of September 2011, 494,755 voters were registered in the district, giving its voters the second lowest vote weight in the country behind Chiba 4th district.

After the introduction of single-member districts, Kanagawa 10th district went narrowly to NFP Representative Eiji Nagai who had represented the pre-reform five-member Kanagawa 2nd district for the Japan New Party since 1993. Nagai became a Democrat in the wake of the NFP dissolution, but lost the district to Liberal Democrat Kazunori Tanaka (Yamasaki faction). Tanaka who became Senior Vice Minister during the Koizumi and First Abe Cabinets held onto the 10th district until the landslide election of 2009 when he lost to Democrat Kōriki Jōjima (Kawabata group=ex-DSP faction) who had been a representative from Tokyo (under his real name Masamitsu Jōjima) between 1996 and 2005. Jōjima went on to become a minister of state in the Noda Cabinet in 2011. In 2012, he was voted out of the House of Representatives alongside seven other sitting ministers in the Noda Cabinet. Tanaka was again appointed as a Senior Vice Minister in the Second Abe Cabinet.

List of representatives

Election results

References 

Kanagawa Prefecture
Districts of the House of Representatives (Japan)